Cowmire Creek (sometimes spelled Cow Mire Creek) is a stream in St. Louis County in the U.S. state of Missouri. It is a tributary of the Missouri River.

Cowmire Creek was so named on account of its often miry condition.

See also
List of rivers of Missouri

References

Rivers of St. Louis County, Missouri
Rivers of Missouri